The Busan Marine Natural History Museum is a museum displaying exhibits on marine  natural history of Busan and located in Dongnae-gu, Busan. It was founded in 1994. The purpose of the foundation is to preserve, to study and to exhibit geological and biological records about the local environment.

See also 
National Maritime Museum

External links

  Busan Marine Natural History Museum

Natural history museums in South Korea
Museums in Busan
Museums established in 1994
1994 establishments in South Korea